The French submarine Narval was a Requin-class submarine built for the French Navy in the mid-1920s. Laid down in March 1923, it was launched in May 1925 and commissioned in July 1926. It joined the Free French naval forces at Malta at the time of the French surrender during World War II. On or around 15 December 1940, Narval sank after striking a mine in the same minefield off the Kerkennah Islands that sank her sister ship Morse six months prior.

Design
Propulsion while surfaced was provided by two  diesel motors and two  electric motors.

Career 
From 1935 to 1937, Narval underwent a thorough overhaul. At the outbreak of World War II, Narval served in the Mediterranean Sea, joining the 4th Submarine Flotilla in Bizerte, then being transferred to Beirut. Narvals commander was Captain Cloarec. On 11 June 1940, Narval returned to Bizerte. At the time of signing the French surrender, the ship was on patrol, and its commander ignored the order on 17 June to stop visiting the British ports, and sailed to Malta. She entered the Free French Naval Forces. On 15 December 1940, Narval blew up on a mine in the same minefield off the Kerkennah Islands that sank her sister ship Morse six months earlier.

References

Books 

World War II submarines of France
Requin-class submarines
Ships sunk by mines
World War II shipwrecks in the Mediterranean Sea